Mike Chase (born April 17, 1952) is an American former stock car racing driver. Winner of the 1994 series championship in the NASCAR Winston West Series, he has also competed in the Winston Cup Series, Busch Series, and Craftsman Truck Series and currently works for Penske Racing as a crewman.

Personal life 
Born in Redding, California, Chase moved to the Charlotte, North Carolina area in 1993 to further his racing career.

Early career 
Growing up competing at Shasta Speedway in his native California, Chase began competing in NASCAR touring series in the mid-1980s, winning the 1987 championship in the Featherlite Southwest Tour; Chase also made his debut in the Busch Series in 1986 at Darlington Raceway, finishing 32nd.

Chase moved up to the Winston West Series in 1990 where he won Rookie of the Year. In 1991 he made his debut in the Winston Cup Series, competing in a combination race at Sears Point Raceway; he finished 25th in the event. Chase would run selected races in Winston Cup over the next few years, in addition to selected Winston West events; his best finish in Cup came at Michigan International Speedway in 1990 where he finished 24th.

In addition to his racing career, in the early 1990s Chase worked as the head of stock car racing for A. J. Foyt Enterprises; he planned to attempt to qualify for the Indianapolis 500 on two occasions with the team, but was not approved by USAC for competition.

Brickyard and Trucks 
In 1994, Chase qualified for the 1994 Brickyard 400, the inaugural stock car race at the Indianapolis Motor Speedway. The event, although on the Winston Cup Series schedule, was a combination race between Cup and the Winston West Series; despite running too slow to make the field for the race on time, Chase started 43rd in the event due to being eligible for a provisional starting spot as the then-current Winston West Series points leader. He finished 42nd in the race, being involved in an accident after completing 91 of the race's 160 laps.

Chase would go on to win the 1994 Winston West series championship, winning five times over the course of the season. Chase moved to the Winston Cup Series in 1995, intending to run full-time for Rookie of the Year in the No. 32 Active Racing Chevrolet; however, after failing to qualify for the first race of the season, the Daytona 500, Chase was released by team owner Dean Myers and replaced by Jimmy Hensley.

Chase returned part-time to the West Series for the remainder of 1995, winning twice, as well as running eight races in the SuperTruck Series, making his first race in the series at Bristol Motor Speedway for Chesrown Racing, where he finished 27th; later that year he replaced P. J. Jones in the No. 1 DieHard Chevrolet for team owner Scoop Vessels, posting a best finish of 16th in seven races.

In 1996, Chase returned to the renamed Craftsman Truck Series, driving for Steve Sellers Racing; driving in seven events for the team, he posted a best finish of 13th at Portland Speedway. Chase would run selected races in the Winston West Series in 1998, before returning to the series for a full season in 1999 with Green Light Racing; he failed to win a race but finished seventh in points.

Chase would run three races in the Nationwide Series for ST Motorsports in 2001, with a best finish of 27th; these would be his final races in NASCAR competition.

After racing 
After retiring from competition, Chase worked for several race teams, including Wood Brothers Racing; he currently works for Penske Racing as a fabricator. Chase has also worked as a crew chief in the Nationwide Series.

Chase was inducted into the West Coast Stock Car Hall of Fame in 2010.

Motorsports career results

NASCAR
(key) (Bold – Pole position awarded by qualifying time. Italics – Pole position earned by points standings or practice time. * – Most laps led.)

Winston Cup Series

Busch Series

Craftsman Truck Series

References 
Notes

Citations

External links
 

Living people
1952 births
American Speed Association drivers
People from Redding, California
Racing drivers from California
NASCAR drivers
A. J. Foyt Enterprises drivers